Physa mezzalirai is a fossil species of extinct air-breathing freshwater snail, an aquatic pulmonate gastropod mollusk in the family Physidae. This species has a small and left-handed (or sinistral) shell, as is always the case in this family. Physa mezzalirai dates from the Turonian to Santonian-aged Adamantina Formation (Upper Cretaceous Bauru Group), in São Paulo state, Brazil.

References

Physidae
Cretaceous gastropods
Late Cretaceous animals of South America
Fossil taxa described in 2011